"Pretty Lady" is a song written and recorded by American country music artist Keith Stegall. It was released in May 1985 as the fourth single from his self-titled debut album. The song peaked at number 10 on the Billboard Hot Country Singles chart. It also reached number 12 on the RPM Country Tracks chart in Canada.

Chart performance

References

1985 songs
1985 singles
Keith Stegall songs
Epic Records singles
Songs written by Keith Stegall
Song recordings produced by Kyle Lehning